DYTL-TV, channel 2, founded 1978, was a television station of Philippine television network People's Television Network. Its studio is located at Lacson Street, Mandalagan, Bacolod City.

See also
People's Television Network

Television channels and stations established in 1978
People's Television Network stations
Television stations in Bacolod